The Isleton Chinese and Japanese Commercial Districts is located in Isleton, California in the Sacramento–San Joaquin River Delta, a large agricultural area in Sacramento County, California. Also known as the Isleton Asian American District, it served as the commercial and social center for both the town's Chinese and Japanese residents and the laborers working in nearby canneries, farms, and ranches. Isleton Asian American District is the only Asian community built in the Delta during the 1920s, and the architectural style of the buildings in the districts, particularly the use of pressed tin siding, is unique to other Delta Asian communities and to the town of Isleton.

Isleton's Chinese and Japanese Commercial Districts, while sharing a main street, were considered two distinct areas. They were listed as one historic district on the National Register of Historic Places in 1991.

Having over 50 original buildings that were built after a fire on May 30, 1926, the two block segment of Main Street was primarily divided; the Japanese-Americans owned homes and businesses on one side while the Chinese-Americans used the other.

After the internment of Japanese-Americans, the area never reclaimed its former multi-ethnic population.

Gallery

References

External links
California Japantowns
Isleton Brannan-Andrus Historical Society

Chicago school architecture in California
Chinese-American culture in California
Geography of Sacramento County, California
Japanese-American culture in California
Historic districts on the National Register of Historic Places in California
National Register of Historic Places in Sacramento County, California